"Too Young" is a popular song, with music written by Sidney Lippman and lyrics by Sylvia Dee. A recording of the song was released by Nat King Cole in 1951, which reached No. 1 in the United States and became the best-selling song of the year. Another successful version was released by Donny Osmond in 1972.

Nat King Cole recording

"Too Young" was one of the early attempts by record labels to release songs with a young musical persona that might appeal to a young audience.  In the United States, among the earliest versions were those recorded by Victor Young and His Orchestra, and Johnny Desmond. However, it was the version recorded by Nat King Cole that proved to be most successful.

The song was recorded on February 6, 1951, and released by Capitol Records (catalog number 1449) in March. It reached the number one position on the Billboard chart in June 1951, staying there for five weeks and altogether on the Best Seller chart for 29 weeks. It also spent an unprecedented 12 weeks on top of Your Hit Parade, and 8 weeks at No. 1 on the Cash Box chart.  It was a million-selling record and  Billboard ranked this version as the number one best-selling song of 1951.  Cole described this song as one of his three favorites among his own songs.

The success of the song may have convinced record executives that young people had the buying power, which would lead to the boom of rock and roll music that catered to a young audience in the mid-50s.

Other early versions 

Several versions contemporary to Nat King Cole's version were recorded, some making the US charts but not as high.

The recording by Patty Andrews was released by Decca Records as catalog number 27569. It first reached the Billboard Best Seller chart on June 8, 1951 and lasted one week on the chart, peaking at number 30. On other Billboard charts, this version reached as high as number 19 on the Most-played Jukebox Records chart.

Versions that did not make the top 30 best-seller list, but did chart on various other Billboard charts were by Toni Arden (Columbia, number 15 on Records Most Played by Disk Jockeys),  by Fran Allison (RCA, number 20 on Records Most Played by Disk Jockeys), and by Richard Hayes (Mercury, number 24).

Semprini, piano with rhythm accompaniment recorded it in London on July 7, 1951, as the second song of the medley "Dancing to the piano (No. 7): Part 1. Hit Medley of Slow Foxtrots" along with "Alice in Wonderland" and "Forbidden Love". It was released by EMI on the His Master's Voice label as catalog number B 10123.

In the United Kingdom, Jimmy Young had a success with his version of the song, also made in 1951. The song made No. 1 on the UK's sheet music charts in 1951, spending 12 weeks in that position. Another contemporary version was released by Steve Conway.

Donny Osmond cover

A version of "Too Young" by then 14-year-old Donny Osmond became an international top 10 hit for him, reaching number 5 in the UK and number 6 in Canada.  It also spent eight weeks on the U.S. top 40, with a peak position of number 13 when released as a single (MGM catalog number 14407) in 1972.

Chart history

Weekly charts

Year-end charts

Other versions

Sam Cooke recorded it for his Hits of the Fifties LP in 1960. In Australia, on Parlophone, Jim Gussey And His Orchestra, with vocals by Matt Dryden and Olive Lester, released their version.
 Bobby Vinton recorded the song for the album There! I've Said It Again.
Michael Jackson included the song on Motown in 1973 in the album Music & Me. This version was released as a single in Italy.
In 1978, the Swedish dansband Vikingarna released a disco version of the song on their album, The Vikings Export.

References

External links
 
 

1951 singles
1972 singles
Nat King Cole songs
Donny Osmond songs
Michael Jackson songs
Marvin Gaye songs
Songs written by Sidney Lippman
Songs with lyrics by Sylvia Dee
1951 songs